The following lists events that happened during 1843 in Chile.

Incumbents
President of Chile: Manuel Bulnes

Events

September
17 September - The University of Chile opens.
21 September - Chile takes possession of the Strait of Magellan.

Births
14 August - Carlos Condell (died 1887)

Deaths
 3 May - Manuel Vicuña Larraín

References 

 
1840s in Chile
Chile
Chile